The Majorcan hare (Lepus granatensis solisi) is a subspecies of the Granada hare, from  Majorca, Spain. It was described only in 1992.  Most sources assume it is an extinct species.

References

Lepus
Mammal extinctions since 1500
Endemic fauna of the Balearic Islands
Fauna of Mallorca
Mammals of Europe
Extinct mammals of Europe